Toh Ma Ma Nae Toh is a 2020 Burmese comedy-drama television series. It aired on MRTV-4, from 31 July to 2 October 2020, on Mondays to Fridays at 19:00 for 46 episodes.

Cast
Myat Thu Thu as Than Than Swe
Hein Min Thu as Than Dana
Moe Thura as Sit Paing
Shin Min Set as Khin Thandar Po
So Pyay Myint as Chit San Maung
Nyi Nanda as U Thura
Myo Sandi Kyaw as Daw Khin Dana
Thet Oo Ko as Than Win Maung
Zin Cho Khine Oo as Phyu Thel
Sharr as Nga Mway Htoe

References

Burmese television series
MRTV (TV network) original programming